Be'er Sheva Center railway station is an Israel Railways terminal in Beersheba. It is located on Yitzhak Ben Zvi street next to the city's central bus station and HaNegev Mall. It is one of two railway stations serving the city, the other being Be'er Sheva North, located near the Ben-Gurion University of the Negev.

Design
The station building is located in the north end of the platforms. As of 2021, the station consists of three platforms (two side platforms and an island platform) serving a total of four tracks. Construction works are expected to be completed in 2022 that will convert the eastern side platform to an island platform which will serve a fifth track at the station. The works will also add an additional public entrance to the station from the southeast.

Space also exists to add an additional passenger platform on the western side of the station in the future.

Services
As of the Fall 2015 schedule there are three trains in each direction per hour between Be'er Sheva Center and central Israel during most hours of the day. Two of these trains use the Railway to Beersheba with a travel time of between 1hr 5mins and 1hr 15mins (depending on the stops along the route) to Tel Aviv HaHagana Railway Station, with some continuing as far north as Nahariya. The other train serving the station uses the Ashkelon–Beersheba railway and the Coastal railway with a travel time between 1hr 30mins and 1hr 45mins to Tel Aviv HaHagana via Ashkelon and Rishon LeZion. These trains then terminate in Hod HaSharon.

Station lines

See also
Beersheba Turkish Railway Station

References

Railway stations in Beersheba
Railway stations opened in 2000
2000 establishments in Israel